The Sichuan field mouse (Apodemus latronum)  is a species of rodent in the family Muridae. It is found in Qinghai and Sichuan provinces of China, and in India and Burma.

References

Rats of Asia
Rodents of China
Rodents of Southeast Asia
Apodemus
Mammals described in 1911
Taxa named by Oldfield Thomas
Taxonomy articles created by Polbot